Lowri Gwyneth Turner (born 31 December 1964) is a British former 1980s–2000s fashion journalist and television presenter, who now works as a private nutritional therapist and clinical hypnotherapist.

Early life
Turner was born in 1964 in London, to Welsh parents Mervyn and Shirley Turner. She received her formal education at the Grey Coat Hospital School, and Camden School for Girls.

Journalism career
Turner began her career as a fashion journalist for The Observer in the late 1980s, and in the 1990s she became fashion editor at the London Evening Standard. In the 1990s and 2000s she was a freelance journalist writing for a wide variety of newspaper titles with oped copy. In 2006, she was criticized in the Welsh Assembly, where she was accused of homophobia for an article that was published in her Western Mail column entitled However much I love my gay friends, I don't want them running the country.

Television career
Turner's television career started on GMTV in 1993. She has been a regular panelist on the Channel Five series The Wright Stuff since 2002.

She was a contributor to Doctor Who: Thirty Years in the TARDIS, a documentary celebration of the 30th anniversary of Doctor Who in 1993, in which she discussed the Edwardian feel to the Doctor's costumes and her fondness for Jon Pertwee's portrayal of the character. 

She has made appearances as a celebrity panelist on BBC2's quiz show Going, Going, Gone, and has presented the shows Looking Good, Shopping City, Housecall, Would Like To Meet and DIY SOS.

In 2004, Turner took part in the reality TV show Celebrity Fit Club.

Health career
Turner now works as a lifestyle advisor in London specialising in diet, having acquired a 'Diploma in Nutritional Therapy' from the Institute for Optimum Nutrition.

Personal life
Turner has been married twice and has three children, two with her first husband Paul Connew, and one daughter with second husband, Nicol Batra, an Indian physician, from whom she is also divorced.

References

External links

1964 births
British fashion journalists
British people of Welsh descent
British women television presenters
GMTV presenters and reporters
Journalists from London
Living people
People educated at Addey and Stanhope School
People educated at Camden School for Girls
Television personalities from London